Parabacteroides merdae  is a Gram-negative, non-sporeforming, obligately anaerobic, rod-shaped, and non-motile bacterium from the genus of Parabacteroides which has been isolated from human faeces in the United States.

References

Further reading 
 

Bacteroidia
Bacteria described in 1986